Saint-Silvain-Bellegarde is a commune in the Creuse department in central France.

Geography
The river Tardes flows northeast through the commune.

Population

See also
Communes of the Creuse department

References

Communes of Creuse